Amar Bukvić (born June 10, 1981) is a Croatian actor. He is a famous Croatian actor who is recognizable for his work in theatre, television and film. He is a member of Gdk Gavella theatre in Zagreb, Croatia.  He has received numerous acting awards, including the Croatian theatre award twice.

Filmography

Notes

External links

1981 births
Living people
21st-century Croatian male actors
Croatian male stage actors
Croatian male film actors
Croatian male television actors
Male actors from Zagreb

Bosniaks of Croatia